Verkh-Neyvinsky is an urban locality (a work settlement) in Nevyansky District of Sverdlovsk Oblast, Russia.
Population:

History
Work settlement status was granted to it in 1928.

Administrative and municipal status
Within the framework of administrative divisions, Verkh-Neyvinsky is subordinated to Nevyansky District. As a municipal division, the work settlement of Verkh-Neyvinsky is incorporated as Verkh-Neyvinsky Urban Okrug.

References

Notes

Sources

External links
Official website of Verkh-Neyvinsky 
Unofficial website of Verkh-Neyvinsky 

Urban-type settlements in Sverdlovsk Oblast
Yekaterinburgsky Uyezd